A canal junction is a place at which two or more canal routes converge or diverge. This implies a physical connection between the beds of the two canals (commonly in the form of a T junction) as opposed to them crossing on different levels e.g. via an aqueduct. 

Where the canals were originally owned by different companies there is often a stop lock at the junction.

In some cases, the creation of a canal junction caused a town to grow up alongside.

See also
Lock (canal)
List of canal junctions in the United Kingdom
List of canal aqueducts in the United Kingdom

References

Canals
Canal